Brandon Powell (born September 12, 1995) is an American football wide receiver who is a free agent. He played college football at Florida. He has been a member of the Detroit Lions, Atlanta Falcons, Buffalo Bills, and the Miami Dolphins.

College career
Powell entered the Florida football program out of Deerfield Beach High School as a four-star recruit and was ranked 267th overall in the ESPN 300 and was also the 34th ranked athlete in the 2014 recruiting class. Brandon began his collegiate career as a running back at Florida. He later switched to wide receiver his sophomore year. During his freshman season, he caught 15 passes for 147 yards with a touchdown. As a sophomore, Powell caught 29 passes for 390 yards and three touchdowns, including a career long 77 yard score against Ole Miss. As a junior, he had 45 receptions for 387 yards and 2 touchdowns. During his senior year, Powell had a team high 42 receptions for 406 yards and 3 touchdowns.

Professional career

Detroit Lions
Powell signed for the Detroit Lions as an undrafted free agent on May 11, 2018. On December 30, Powell started in place of Kenny Golladay and caught six passes for 103 yards against the Green Bay Packers.

On August 31, 2019, Powell was waived by the Lions.

Atlanta Falcons
On September 2, 2019, Powell was signed to the Atlanta Falcons practice squad. On November 5, 2019, Powell was promoted to the active roster.

Buffalo Bills
Powell signed with the Buffalo Bills on a one-year contract on March 26, 2021. He was released on August 30, 2021.

Miami Dolphins
On September 2, 2021, Powell was signed to the Miami Dolphins practice squad. He was released on October 12.

Los Angeles Rams
On November 4, 2021, Powell was signed to the Los Angeles Rams practice squad. On December 26, 2021 in a game against the Minnesota Vikings, Powell returned a punt 61 yards for a touchdown that was key in the Rams' victory, ensuring a playoff berth for the team. He was named NFC  Special Teams Player of the Week for the first time in his NFL career for his performance.  Powell won Super Bowl LVI against the Cincinnati Bengals.

On March 19, 2022, Powell re-signed with the Rams on a one-year deal.

References

External links
Atlanta Falcons bio

1995 births
Living people
American football wide receivers
Atlanta Falcons players
Buffalo Bills players
Powell, Brandon
Detroit Lions players
Florida Gators football players
Los Angeles Rams players
Miami Dolphins players
People from Deerfield Beach, Florida
Players of American football from Florida
Sportspeople from Broward County, Florida